Roger Sherman Baldwin (January 4, 1793 – February 19, 1863) was an American politician who served as the 32nd Governor of Connecticut from 1844 to 1846 and a United States senator from 1847 to 1851.  As a lawyer, his career was most notable for his participation in the 1841 Amistad case.

Early life
Baldwin was born in New Haven, Connecticut, the son of Simeon Baldwin and Rebecca Sherman. He was the maternal grandson of notable founding father Roger Sherman (the only person to sign all four great state papers of the U.S.: the Continental Association, the Declaration of Independence, the Articles of Confederation and the Constitution. Through his father he was descended from Robert Treat, Samuel Appleton and Simon Willard. Through his mother he was descended from Samuel Stone and William Blaxton. He attended Hopkins School, and entered Yale College at the age of fourteen, and graduated with high honors in 1811. At Yale, Baldwin was a member of the Linonian Society. After leaving Yale he studied law in his father's office in New Haven, and also in the Litchfield Law School, and was admitted to the bar in 1814. Although repeatedly called into public office, he devoted himself through life to the profession of his choice, attaining the highest distinction, especially in the discussion of questions of law. His defense in 1841, of the rights of the Africans of the Amistad, is particularly celebrated, both for his ability and for the importance of the case.

Political career
After having been a member of the city government in New Haven, in 1826 and 1828, Baldwin was elected in 1837 and again in 1838 as a member of the Connecticut State Senate. In 1840 and 1841 he represented the town of New Haven in the General Assembly. He was elected Governor of Connecticut in 1844 by the state legislature, and was re-elected in 1845. In 1844, Governor Roger Sherman Baldwin proposed legislation to end slavery, but the General Assembly did not pass it until it was reintroduced in 1848 as "An Act to Prevent Slavery". On the death of Senator Jabez W. Huntington in 1847, Baldwin was appointed by Governor Clark Bissell to fill the vacancy in the United States Senate, and in December of that year he took his seat as a member of that body. He was elected by the Legislature in the following May to the same position, which he held until 1851. After that period he held no public office, except that he was one of the presidential electors in the canvass of 1860, and by appointment of Governor William Alfred Buckingham was a delegate to the Peace Convention which met in Washington, in 1861, by request of the State of Virginia.  He was described as a devout Christian who studied the Bible every day.

Baldwin died in New Haven, February 19, 1863; at the age of 70 and was interred at Grove Street Cemetery. A biographical discourse was pronounced at his funeral by Rev. Dr. Dutton, which was printed in the New Englander for April 1863, and was also published as a pamphlet.

Family
He was grandson of Roger Sherman, son of Simeon Baldwin, nephew of Ebenezer Baldwin, husband of Emily Pitkin Perkins, father of Connecticut Governor Simeon Eben Baldwin, grandfather of New York Supreme Court Justice Edward Baldwin Whitney, and the great-grandfather of the famed Princeton University mathematics professor Hassler Whitney.

In popular culture
A simplified version of the events regarding the Amistad case were made into a movie called Amistad in 1997 in which Matthew McConaughey portrayed Roger Sherman Baldwin. In Greenwich, Connecticut, there is a town park called Roger Sherman Baldwin Park.

References

External links

Roger Sherman Baldwin Litchfield Ledger - Student
Connecticut Governor Roger Sherman Baldwin from the Connecticut State Library
US Senator Roger Sherman Baldwin US Congress
Baldwin Family Papers (MS 55). Manuscripts and Archives, Yale University Library.
Roger Sherman Baldwin (1793–1863) Guide to Research Papers
Sherman Genealogy Including Families of Essex, Suffolk and Norfolk, England By Thomas Townsend Sherman
 Baldwin-Greene-Gager family of Connecticut  at Political Graveyard
 Sherman-Hoar family  at Political Graveyard
History of the Federal Judiciary
Roger Sherman Baldwin Museum of Connecticut History
From Thomas Jefferson to Roger Sherman Baldwin, 9 March 1822
To Thomas Jefferson from Roger Sherman Baldwin, 24 February 1822
Roger Sherman Baldwin to Thomas Jefferson, February 24, 1822 Library of Congress

1793 births
1863 deaths
Connecticut state senators
Governors of Connecticut
Politicians from New Haven, Connecticut
United States senators from Connecticut
Yale College alumni
Litchfield Law School alumni
Burials at Grove Street Cemetery
Connecticut Whigs
Connecticut Republicans
Whig Party United States senators
Whig Party state governors of the United States
19th-century American politicians
Sherman family (U.S.)
Lawyers from New Haven, Connecticut
La Amistad